Zoo is the fourth studio album by American punk rock band Ceremony. Zoo was released on March 5, 2012 through Matador Records.

Track listing

References

External links 
 

2012 albums
Ceremony (punk band) albums
Matador Records albums